Baugher is a surname. Notable people with the surname include:

Charles Abba Baugher (1893–1962), American academic
Danny Baugher (born 1984), American football player
Forrest Baugher (born 1934), American politician
Henry Louis Baugher (1804–1868), American Lutheran clergyman and academic